Thomas H. Weidemeyer is an American businessman.

Biography

Early life
He graduated from Colgate University and received a graduate degree from the University of North Carolina at Chapel Hill.

Career
He joined the United Parcel Service in 1972. He became Vice President of UPS Airlines in 1990, and Senior Vice President of UPS and  President of UPS Airlines in 1994. From 2001 to 2004, he served as Senior Vice President and Chief Operating Officer of UPS.

He sits on the board of directors of the Goodyear Tire and Rubber Company (since 2004), NRG Energy, Waste Management, Inc, and Amsted Industries.

References

Living people
Colgate University alumni
University of North Carolina at Chapel Hill alumni
American businesspeople
Goodyear Tire and Rubber Company people
Year of birth missing (living people)